Eugnosta multifasciana is a species of moth of the  family Tortricidae. It is found in Central Asia (Alai Mountains and Turkestan).

References

Moths described in 1899
Eugnosta